Danton is a 1921 German silent historical film directed by Dimitri Buchowetzki and starring Emil Jannings, Werner Krauss and Ossip Runitsch. The film was shot at the Johannisthal Studios in Berlin. It premiered at the Ufa-Palast am Zoo in the city on 4 May 1921. It was based on the 1835 play Danton's Death by Georg Büchner.

Synopsis
At the height of Reign of Terror Maximilien Robespierre orchestrates the trial and execution of several of his fellow leading French revolutionaries including Georges Danton.

Cast
 Emil Jannings as Danton
 Werner Krauss as Robespierre
 Ossip Runitsch as Desmoulins
 Ferdinand von Alten as Herault-Séchelles
 Eduard von Winterstein as Gen. Westermann
 Charlotte Ander as Lucile Desmoulins
 Maly Delschaft as Julia
  as Babette
 Hugo Döblin as Henriot
 Friedrich Kühne as Fouquier-Tinville
 Robert Scholz as St. Just
 Hans Dreier
 Albert Florath

References

Bibliography

External links

1921 films
Films about Georges Danton
Films of the Weimar Republic
German silent feature films
German historical films
UFA GmbH films
Films directed by Dimitri Buchowetzki
German films based on plays
1920s historical films
Films with screenplays by Carl Mayer
Cultural depictions of Georges Danton
Cultural depictions of Maximilien Robespierre
German black-and-white films
Adaptations of works by Georg Büchner
1920s German films
Films shot at Johannisthal Studios